Umeå Municipality is a municipality in Västerbotten County in northern Sweden. Its seat is Umeå, which is also the county seat of Västerbotten County.

Administration

The municipality is an administrative entity defined by geographical borders, consisting of Umeå and a large area around it. The present municipality consists of many former local government units joined together in a series of municipal reforms carried out between 1952 and 1974.

A 65-member municipal assembly (kommunfullmäktige) is elected by proportional representation for a four-year term. The assembly appoints the 9-member executive committee (kommunstyrelsen) and the 7 governing commissioners. The executive committee and the commissioners are headed by the chairman (kommunstyrelsens ordförande), since 1996 Social Democrat Lennart Holmlund (b. 1946). Since the 2010 municipal election the municipality is headed by a Social Democratic-Left Party coalition a single seat short of absolute majority. Of the eight parties represented in the Riksdag since 2010, all but the Sweden Democrats are found in the assembly, as well as the breakaway Socialist Justice Party headed by former Social Democrat Jan Hägglund (holding its only seat), renamed the Workers' Party in 2011.

Localities
There are 20 localities (or urban areas) in Umeå Municipality:

The municipal seat in bold

Other villages:
Brännland
Gravmark
Gunnismark

International relations

Twin towns — Sister cities

Umeå Municipality is twinned with:
 Saskatoon, Canada
 Qufu, People's Republic of China
 Helsingør Municipality, Denmark
 Vaasa, Finland
 Würzburg, Germany
 Guanajuato, Mexico
 Harstad, Norway
 Petrozavodsk, Russia
 Osmangazi (Bursa), Turkey
 Nilufer (Bursa), Turkey

In Twin Towns' Park (Vänortsparken) is the artwork Tellus: it is a map of the world, with each sister city's location. Each sister city also has a designated themed area in the park.

See also
 Blue Highway, tourist route (Norway - Sweden - Finland - Russia)

References

External links

Umeå Municipality - Official site

 
Municipalities of Västerbotten County
Umeå